Alexandros Kaklamanos (born 20 May 1974) is a Greek footballer who currently plays for Kleovoulos Lindou as a striker.

Career
He played in many teams such as Ialysos, Olympiacos, Athinaikos, Panelefsiniakos, Charleroi, Gent, Standard Liège, APOEL, Ergotelis, Kerkyra, Enosis Neon Paralimni and Rodos For the season 2011–2012, he was signed by R.U. Saint-Gilloise. He also has played for Kleanthis Paradeisiou, Peramaikos and Thrasyvoulos.

References

External links
 
Myplayer Profile

1974 births
Living people
People from Rhodes
Greek footballers
Greek expatriate footballers
Association football forwards
Expatriate footballers in Belgium
Expatriate footballers in Cyprus
Belgian Pro League players
Super League Greece players
Cypriot First Division players
Olympiacos F.C. players
Athinaikos F.C. players
R. Charleroi S.C. players
K.A.A. Gent players
Standard Liège players
APOEL FC players
A.O. Kerkyra players
Ergotelis F.C. players
Enosis Neon Paralimni FC players
Rodos F.C. players
Royale Union Saint-Gilloise players
Thrasyvoulos F.C. players
GAS Ialysos 1948 F.C. players
Panelefsiniakos F.C. players
Sportspeople from the South Aegean
21st-century Greek people